Syed Khurshid Mohammad Mohsin is an Indian politician who is serving as a member of the Bihar Legislative Council since 23 March 2018 representing the Rashtriya Janata Dal, when 11 candidates were elected unopposed.

He died in office in January 2019.

References

Living people
Members of the Bihar Legislative Council
Rashtriya Janata Dal politicians
Year of birth missing (living people)